Su Huan-chih (born July 20, 1956) was the magistrate of Tainan County from 2001 to 2010, until Tainan County's merger into Tainan City. Born in a rural township in southern Taiwan, Su graduated from National Taiwan University. He passed the bar examination in 1986 and started his career as a lawyer.

Su made his entry into politics in the 1990s. He was elected legislator three times in a row serving from 1992 to 2001. As an experienced legislator, Su launched a magisterial campaign in 2001 and was elected with over 51% of the votes, becoming the second member of the Democratic Progressive Party to ever hold the position.

Early life and career
Su Huan-chih was born on 20 July 1956 in Cigu, Tainan County. He grew up in the agriculture-based township during his childhood years.

Su began studying at the prestigious National Taiwan University majoring in physics. He decided to drop out and switched his major to laws in 1977. After passing the bar examination, Su started his career as a practicing lawyer. With his academic experience in physics, he was hired by IBM Taiwan to serve as its patent attorney.

Su gave up his job at IBM and went back to his hometown to run for legislator. He was elected a member of the Legislative Yuan in 1992. He promoted the senior welfare and environmental protection. Having been elected three times in a row, Su worked to decrease the difference in resource distribution between northern and southern Taiwan.

Tainan magistracy
Su was elected the magistrate of Tainan County and took office on December 20, 2001. He focused on preserving the environment of the region. For example, he worked with international ecologists and planned to build a research center near the habitat of black-faced spoonbills with a goal to preserve these endangered birds.

The Su administration also improved the technological economy of the region. The net worth of the Tainan Science Park grew from NT$50.1 billion in 2001 to NT$451.6 billion in 2006. Apart from the growth in profit, many new industrial parks were established. As a result, Tainan County transformed from an agrarian county to a technological county.

Despite the technological innovations, Su also promoted agriculture of southern Taiwan. The Taiwan Orchid Plantation was founded during his term. The plantation has held three international exhibitions since its establishment. The exhibitions attracted more than 600 thousand visitors gaining NT$400 million from export orders.

Later political career
In March 2018, Su began his independent campaign for the Taipei mayoralty. He ended his Taipei mayoral bid in July, choosing to contest the same office in Tainan.

During the 2022 local election cycle, Su contested the Taipei mayoralty.

References

External links

Taiwan Orchid Plantation

1956 births
Living people
Magistrates of Tainan County
Democratic Progressive Party Members of the Legislative Yuan
Tainan Members of the Legislative Yuan
National Taiwan University alumni
Fu Jen Catholic University alumni
Members of the 2nd Legislative Yuan
Members of the 3rd Legislative Yuan
Members of the 4th Legislative Yuan
IBM employees
21st-century Taiwanese judges
Taiwanese political party founders
20th-century Taiwanese lawyers